The Mountainside School District is a community public school district, that serves students in pre-kindergarten through eighth grade in the borough of Mountainside, in Union County, New Jersey, United States.

As of the 2020–21 school year, the district, comprised of two schools, had an enrollment of 725 students and 71.3 classroom teachers (on an FTE basis), for a student–teacher ratio of 10.2:1.

The district is classified by the New Jersey Department of Education as being in District Factor Group "I", the second-highest of eight groupings. District Factor Groups organize districts statewide to allow comparison by common socioeconomic characteristics of the local districts. From lowest socioeconomic status to highest, the categories are A, B, CD, DE, FG, GH, I and J.

Public school students in ninth through twelfth grades attend Governor Livingston High School in Berkeley Heights, as part of a sending/receiving relationship with the Berkeley Heights Public Schools that is covered by an agreement that runs through the end of 2021-22 school year. As of the 2020–21 school year, the high school had an enrollment of 960 students and 87.9 classroom teachers (on an FTE basis), for a student–teacher ratio of 10.9:1. 

Students also have the choice to attend the programs of the Union County Vocational Technical Schools, which serve students from across Union County.

Schools
Schools in the district (with 2020–21 enrollment data from the National Center for Education Statistics) are:
Beechwood School with 256 students in grades PreK-2
Jessica Vierschilling, Principal
Deerfield School with 461 students in grades 3-8
Suzanne Jenks, Principal

Administration
Core members of the district's administration are:
Janet Walling, Superintendent
Steven K. Robinson, Interim Business Administrator / Board Secretary

Board of education
The district's board of education is comprised of seven members who set policy and oversee the fiscal and educational operation of the district through its administration. As a Type II school district, the board's trustees are elected directly by voters to serve three-year terms of office on a staggered basis, with either two or three seats up for election each year held (since 2012) as part of the November general election. The board appoints a superintendent to oversee the day-to-day operation of the district.

References

External links
Mountainside School District Website

Data for the Mountainside School District, National Center for Education Statistics

Mountainside, New Jersey
New Jersey District Factor Group I
School districts in Union County, New Jersey